Davydd Greenwood (born 1942) is the Goldwin Smith Professor of Anthropology and Director of the Institute for European Studies at Cornell University.

Known action researcher, Greenwood has conducted studies in the Spanish Basque Country, where he analysed Mondragón Corporation, empowerment and cooperatives phenomena. He currently focuses on the future of university idea, in the era of corporate culture.

Greenwood was elected Corresponding Member of the Spanish Royal Academy of Moral and Political Sciences.

Publications 
 Davydd Greenwood, Morten Levin (1998) Introduction to Action Research: Social Research for Social Change. Thousand Oaks, California, Sage Publications, Inc
  Davydd Greenwood, José Luis González (1992) Industrial Democracy as Process: Participatory Action Research in the Fagor Cooperative Group of Mondragón, (co-authors Julio Cantón Alonso, Ino Galparsoro Markaide, Alex Goiricelaya Arruza, Isabel Legarreta Nuin, and Kepa Salaberría Amesti), Assen-Maastricht, Van Gorcum Publishers.

References

 Davydd Greenwood - Goldwin Smith Professor of Anthropology. Cornell University. Accessed 2014-02-27.
 Town Twinning. Cornell University Institute for European Studies. Accessed 2011-01-04.

American anthropologists
Mondragon Corporation
Living people
1942 births
Cornell University faculty